Fused is the second solo album by Black Sabbath guitarist Tony Iommi, released in 2005. The album also features vocalist/bassist Glenn Hughes (who briefly fronted Black Sabbath in the mid-1980s, assuming vocal duties on the album Seventh Star – an album that was originally intended to be Iommi's first solo album) and drummer Kenny Aronoff.

The album was recorded in Monnow Valley Studios, Wales in December 2004 and BHM's studio in Warwickshire, England, and was produced by Bob Marlette (who also contributed keyboards and bass on the album) and Iommi. Fused reached number 34 on Billboard's Top Heatseekers chart.

Track listing

Personnel 
per liner notes
Tony Iommi – lead and rhythm guitars, additional production
Glenn Hughes – vocals, bass
Kenny Aronoff – drums
Bob Marlette – keyboards, bass, production, engineering
Mike Exeter – additional engineering, programming
Hugh Gilmour – artwork, design
Ralph Baker – executive producer
Jeff Greenberg – legal at Beldock, Levine & Hoffman, NYC
JMO Design – logo
Dick Beetham – mastering
Sid Riggs – programming
Mike Clement – equipment technician

Charts

References

External links 
Fused at Black Sabbath Online

2005 albums
Sanctuary Records albums
Glenn Hughes albums
Collaborative albums
Albums produced by Bob Marlette
Tony Iommi albums